Rose Bernadou (born 27 March June 1981) is a French rugby union player. She plays for the France women's national rugby union team and Montpellier Hérault Rugby as a prop forward.

Career
Bernadou began playing rugby at the age of 8 in Rives-d'Orb near Béziers. She studied in Toulouse before joining Montpellier Hérault Rugby aged 18. Bernadou made her international debut for France on 25 October, 2020 against Scotland.

She was named in France's team for the delayed 2021 Rugby World Cup in New Zealand.

References

 2000 births
Living people
French female rugby union players